Leotis Martin (June 17, 1939 – November 20, 1995) was an American boxer, the first ever NABF heavyweight champion and is best known for his victory over former heavyweight champion Sonny Liston. Martin was a good puncher and a fairly skilled heavyweight who fought from 1962 to 1969. He compiled a record of 31 wins (19 KOs) and 5 losses and in 2003 was named on The Rings list of 100 greatest punchers of all time. His career, however, was marked by inconsistency and bad luck.

Amateur career
Martin was the 1960 Chicago and Intercity Golden Gloves 160-pound champion and the 1961 160-pound Intercity Golden Gloves Champion (alternate). He also was the United States National AAU 165-pound champion in 1960 and 1961.

Professional career

From February 1964, when Martin fought on the Liston-Clay world heavyweight championship fight undercard, to June 1967, Martin fought 15 times without suffering a defeat. This winning streak qualified him for the WBA heavyweight elimination championship series, after the organization had stripped Muhammad Ali of its world heavyweight crown when he refused induction into the United States Army. But even this win streak was laced with hard luck,  On May 10, 1965, he faced Sonny Banks, then one of only two fighters to have knocked Muhammad Ali down for a count. Martin scored a ninth-round knockout over Banks. Martin's jubilation was short lived. Banks never recovered from the blows he received during the fight and died from his injuries.

Although Martin was selected for the WBA title elimination tournament, he was matched, in his first fight, against the ultimate tournament winner Jimmy Ellis. The two fought in the Houston Astrodome on August 5, 1967. Ellis, as was his style at the time, came out sharp, trying to score an early knockout with his sneaky-fast and dangerous right hand. Although unable to knock Martin out, Ellis inflicted on the inside of Martin's mouth a nasty cut, which ultimately caused the fight to be stopped in the ninth round. Scoring was around even at that point. Many had predicted Martin might win the elimination series. Martin had campaigned for a contest with fellow Philadelphian Joe Frazier, but it never happened — mainly due to Martin's loss to Bonavena, who got the Frazier match instead.

Martin rebounded from the Ellis defeat by traveling to Germany to knock out German and European heavyweight champion Karl Mildenberger in seven rounds. Martin appeared to be back in contention for a title shot when he dropped a decision to California heavyweight Henry Clark (record 14-3-2). He then came back from that defeat to upset and knock out Thad Spencer in nine rounds. His title quest, however, again was derailed when Martin travelled to Argentina to meet Oscar Bonavena in his home town of Buenos Aires, where he lost by decision. Bonavena went on to fight Frazier for the world title.

After the Bonavena loss, Martin put together a four-fight win streak, including two wins over Detroit hometown favorite Al "Blue" Lewis. These fine efforts landed him a match with veteran former champion Sonny Liston on December 6, 1969. Liston had resumed boxing after his two stunning losses to Muhammad Ali, and had run off a winning streak of 14 fights with 13 knockouts. Although slowed by age, Liston was still a feared heavyweight.

Martin, who formerly had been Liston's sparring partner, devised a simple fight plan. Rather than attempting to slug with the bigger and heavier Liston, Martin stayed away from him, boxing and waiting for the older man to tire. Despite a close call in the fourth round when Liston caught him with a booming left hook that knocked Martin down, Martin seemed to get stronger with every passing round while Liston weakened. Finally, in the ninth round, Martin hit Liston with a powerful combination that knocked the former champion out. Fate, however, double-crossed Martin once again. He had suffered a detached retina during the fight, and was forced to retire before he could capitalize on the biggest win of his career.

After boxing
For the next 26 years Martin lived a quiet life in the Mount Airy section of Philadelphia. Early in 1995 he retired from Budd & Co. after 31 years as a machinist. In November that year Martin had a stroke brought on by hypertension and complications from diabetes, and died en route to a local hospital, aged 56.

Martin's death received little coverage in the boxing media.

Professional boxing record

References

External links
 

!colspan=3 style="background:#C1D8FF;"| Regional titles

Boxers from Arkansas
Heavyweight boxers
1939 births
1995 deaths
Winners of the United States Championship for amateur boxers
People from Helena, Arkansas
American male boxers